Leopardi is a crater on Mercury. Its name was adopted by the International Astronomical Union in 1976. Leopardi is named for the Italian writer Giacomo Leopardi, who lived from 1798 to 1837.

An escarpment called Altair Rupes cuts across Leopardi crater.  It extends to the east and to the northwest from the crater.

References

Impact craters on Mercury
Giacomo Leopardi